Graceway Pharmaceuticals was a USA LLC based in Tennessee.

Products include:
Aldara & Zyclara topical immune response modifier imiquimod
Alu-Cap and Alu-Tab antacid aluminum hydroxide
Atopiclair topical emollient
Benziq topical acne agent benzoyl peroxide
Benziq Wash topical acne agent benzoyl peroxide
Calcium Disodium Versenate antidote edetate calcium disodium
Disalcid salicylates salsalate
Durable Barr topical emollient
Estrasorb estrogen estradiol
Maxair adrenergic bronchodilator inhaler pirbuterol
Medihaler-Epi adrenergic bronchodilator, catecholamine, vasopressor epinephrine
MetroGel-Vaginal anti-infective metronidazole 
Urex urine tract anti-infective methenamine
Minitran antianginal vasodilator nitroglycerin
Norflex, Norgesic Forte  algesic and skeletal muscle relaxant orphenadrine
Qvar corticosteroid inhaler beclomethasone
Tambocor antiarrhythmicflecainide
Theolair methylxanthine theophylline
Titralac antacid calcium carbonate

Graceway declared bankruptcy in 2011 and its assets were purchased by Medicis Pharmaceutical Corporation of Scottsdale AZ.

References

Defunct pharmaceutical companies of the United States